Mulligrubs was an Australian children's television series that aired on Network Ten from 3 October 1988 to 27 December 1996. The series was made by affiliate ADS in Adelaide and was aimed at pre-schoolers.

About 550 episodes were made, with about 425 being stored intact at the National Film and Sound Archive of Australia.

The show was best remembered for the face (made up of just eyes, eyebrows, nostrils and mouth) on a blue screen that appeared occasionally during the program. The actress who played the part of 'the face' was Diana Kidd (born circa. 1951-1952).

References

External links
 Portion of a Mulligrubs episode on YouTube 

Australian children's television series
Australian television shows featuring puppetry
Network 10 original programming
1988 Australian television series debuts
1996 Australian television series endings
Television shows set in Adelaide